Erich Bergen (born December 31, 1985) is an American actor, singer and presenter, best known for his roles as Bob Gaudio in the biographical musical drama film Jersey Boys and as Blake Moran in the CBS television series Madam Secretary.

He attended the Stagedoor Manor Performing Arts Center in Loch Sheldrake, New York, for seven years before studying at the University of North Carolina School of the Arts. His television credits include Gossip Girl, Desperate Housewives, Person of Interest and Franklin & Bash. From 2014 through 2019, Bergen appeared on the CBS television series Madam Secretary as Blake Moran, personal Secretary to fictionalized Secretary of State Elizabeth McCord (played by Téa Leoni).

In 2013, Bergen was diagnosed with testicular cancer and underwent chemotherapy.

He made his Broadway debut in June 2018, as Dr. Pomatter in Waitress. After leaving the cast in August 2018, Bergen returned to the Broadway production as Dr. Pomatter from June 4 through July 21, 2019. He then returned after the COVID-19 pandemic in 2021 for a limited time.

Filmography

References

External links
 

1985 births
20th-century American male actors
21st-century American male actors
American male film actors
American male television actors
Living people
Male actors from New York City